Vlug is a surname. Notable people with the surname include:

Dirk J. Vlug (1916–1996), American Medal of Honor recipient
Jeffrey Vlug (born 1986), Dutch footballer